Dr. Halimah binti Ali is a Malaysian politician and served as Selangor State Executive Councillor. At the state government level, he is the former Pengerusi Jawatankuasa Tetap Pendidikan, Pendidikan Tinggi dan Modal Insan Kerajaan Negeri Selangor, PAS Selangor Transportation Expert, Former Pengerusi Perbadanan Perpustakaan Awam Selangor (PPAS) and chairman of Lajnah Perpaduan Nasional PAS Selangor.

Election results
 
'''Selangor State Legislative Assembly

Honours
 :
  Companion of the Order of Loyalty to the Crown of Malaysia (JSM) (2021)

References

Living people
1960 births
Malaysian Muslims
Malaysian Islamic Party politicians
Members of the Selangor State Legislative Assembly
Selangor state executive councillors
Women MLAs in Selangor
21st-century Malaysian politicians
21st-century Malaysian women politicians